Original Cinema is the twenty-sixth album by Spyro Gyra, released on February 25, 2003. At Billboard magazine, the album peaked at No. 14 on the Jazz Albums chart.

Track listing 
 "Bump It Up" (Julio Fernández) - 4:52
 "Extrovertical" (Jay Beckenstein) - 6:21
 "Dream Sequence" (Beckenstein) - 5:01
 "Party of Seven" (Joel Rosenblatt, Bette Sussman) - 4:51
 "Big Dance Number" (Beckenstein) - 3:27
 "Close-Up" (Fernandez) - 3:47
 "Film Noir" (Beckenstein) - 6:12
 "Cape Town Love" (Beckenstein) - 5:17
 "Handheld" (Scott Ambush) - 4:01
 "Funky Tina" (Fernandez) - 5:17
 "Getaway" (Jeremy Wall) - 4:11
 "Calle Ocho" (Beckenstein) - 5:30
 "Flashback" (Beckenstein) - 3:36

Personnel 

Spyro Gyra
 Jay Beckenstein – saxophones
 Tom Schuman – keyboards
 Julio Fernández – guitars
 Scott Ambush – bass guitar
 Joel Rosenblatt – drums

Additional musicians
 Dave Charles – percussion (1, 11)
 Mino Cinélu – percussion (2, 4, 7, 8)
 Dave Samuels – vibraphone (3, 4, 8, 12)
 Andy Narell – steel drums (4, 8)
 Marc Quiñones – percussion (10, 11)

Production 
 Jay Beckenstein – producer 
 Doug Oberkircher – recording, mixing 
 Eric Carlinsky – additional recording, assistant engineer 
 J. P. Sheganoski – assistant engineer 
 Scott Hull – mastering 
 Michael Bishop – surround sound mastering

Studios
 Recorded and Mixed at BearTracks Studios (Suffern, New York).
 Mastered at The Hit Factory (New York City, New York).

References

External links
 Original Cinema on Spyro Gyra's official website

Spyro Gyra albums
2003 albums
Heads Up International albums